Psilacantha is a genus of moths belonging to the subfamily Olethreutinae of the family Tortricidae.

Species
Psilacantha charidotis (Durrant, 1915)
Psilacantha creserias (Meyrick, 1905)
Psilacantha manifesta Diakonoff, 1973
Psilacantha pryeri (Walsingham, 1900)
Psilacantha spinosa Diakonoff, 1973

See also
List of Tortricidae genera

References

External links
tortricidae.com

Tortricidae genera
Olethreutinae
Taxa named by Alexey Diakonoff